Elena Rostropovich (Moscow, June 22, 1958) is a pianist. She left Russia with her parents, cellist and conductor Mstislav Rostropovich and soprano Galina Vishnevskaya in 1974.

She is an acclaimed musician and philanthropist whose work on behalf of the health and well-being of children in such diverse parts of the world as the postSoviet republics, the Near East and Western Europe has gained wide recognition.

Early years

She began to study piano at the age of 4 with her grandmother, Sofia, a talented pianist. At the age of 6 she entered the preConservatory Central Music School in Moscow where she continued to study piano with renowned piano teacher, Evgeny Timakin. Her first appearance as a soloist with orchestra was at the age of 11 in Yaroslavl, Russia. In 1974, her father and mother were forced to leave Russia with their two daughters for publicly defending and supporting the dissident writer Alexander Solzhenitsyn.

In 1975, Elena entered the Juilliard School of Music in New York, graduating in only 3 years. She continued her studies in Vermont with Rudolf Serkin. At the same time, Elena began to perform as a soloist and as an accompanist of her father.

Music career

She made her Carnegie Hall debut in 1980. As the sole accompanist of her father for seven years, Elena performed in such musical capitals as New York, Boston, Washington, London, Paris, Frankfurt, Los Angeles, Tokyo, Hong Kong, Jerusalem, and Rio de Janeiro. In 1978, she accompanied her father in concert at the White House for President Jimmy Carter and his wife Rosalynn. This performance was broadcast live worldwide.

In 1989, she became the Vice-President of the 1st International Piano Competition “World Music Masters” in Paris, France.  As a mother of four children she was unable to continue to travel with her father, and so she began to write her own compositions. A record of her work entitled Love without Reasons was released by EMI in 1990.

From 1997 until 2001, Elena was general director of the International Music Festival “Rencontres Musicales d’Evian” (France).

From 2001 until 2007, she managed the career of her father and also joined the Board of Directors of the Rostropovich-Vishnevskaya Foundation (RVF), based in Washington, DC, a charitable organization dedicated to modernizing healthcare for children throughout the world.

Philanthropy

In 2007, following the death of her father, Elena became president of the RVF. From 1991-to the present, RVF has designed and financed sustainable immunization and other children’s public health programs for over 20 million individuals in many countries, including Russia, Azerbaijan, Armenia, Georgia, Kyrgyzstan, Tajikistan, the West Bank and Gaza.

In 2008, she founded the Rostropovich-Vishnevskaya Association, based in Paris, France, to focus on the social issues of children in need. In 2013, the name of the association was changed to the "Association Elena Rostropovich" (AER).
Elena has created various projects for vulnerable children in France and in the Near East, which were then developed together with AER.

Near East 2008–15: Creation of 23 "Al Sununu" Palestinian Children's choirs, mainly in refugee camps in the West Bank, East Jerusalem, Gaza, Jordan, Syria and Lebanon, composed of more than 800 children.

On April 23, 2013 "Al Sununu" choirs in Bethlehem, Gaza City, Amman, Damascus and Beirut have performed simultaneously via satellite a live concert of their traditional music. The children sang songs from their common heritage as if they were together in one location thanks to the use of satellite technology.

France 2011: Creation of Music Room for hearing-impaired children and adolescents at Institut National des Jeunes Sourds in Paris. With the opening of this music room, over 200 deaf students have access to music through vibration, visual and other sensory stimuli that do not depend on the ability to hear sound.

Russia 2013-2015: Developing a new pilot program in Russia : creation of children’s choirs in orphanages in the Moscow area with the participation of over 300 children.

Elena Rostropovich is Honorary Chairwoman of the Board of the Rostropovich Cello Foundation in Kronberg (Germany) and President of the Rostropovich Foundation “Support to Lithuanian Children” (Lithuania).

In 2009, she was named Honorary President of the Rostropovich International Cello Competition in Paris, France.

In 2013, she became a member of Board of Trustees of Chorale Society created by Russian government.

References

1958 births
Living people
Russian pianists
Russian women pianists
Musicians from Moscow
21st-century pianists
Women classical pianists
21st-century women pianists